Burnley Borough Council elections are generally held three years out of every four, with a third of the council elected each time. Burnley Borough Council is the local authority for the non-metropolitan district of Burnley in Lancashire, England. Since the last boundary changes in 2002, 45 councillors have been elected from 15 wards.

Political control

From 1889 to 1974 Burnley was a county borough, independent of any county council. Under the Local Government Act 1972 it had its territory enlarged, gaining Padiham Urban District and much of Burnley Rural District, and at the same time became a non-metropolitan district, with Lancashire County Council providing county-level services. The first election to the reformed borough council was held in 1973, initially operating as a shadow authority before the new arrangements took effect on 1 April 1974. Political control of the council since 1973 has been held by the following parties:

Leadership
The leaders of the council since 2006 have been:

Council elections
1973 Burnley Borough Council election
1976 Burnley Borough Council election (New ward boundaries)
1979 Burnley Borough Council election
1980 Burnley Borough Council election
1982 Burnley Borough Council election
1983 Burnley Borough Council election
1984 Burnley Borough Council election
1986 Burnley Borough Council election
1987 Burnley Borough Council election (Borough boundary changes took place but the number of seats remained the same)
1988 Burnley Borough Council election
1990 Burnley Borough Council election
1991 Burnley Borough Council election (New ward boundaries)
1992 Burnley Borough Council election
1994 Burnley Borough Council election
1995 Burnley Borough Council election
1996 Burnley Borough Council election
1998 Burnley Borough Council election
1999 Burnley Borough Council election
2000 Burnley Borough Council election
2002 Burnley Borough Council election (New ward boundaries reduced the number of seats by 3)
2003 Burnley Borough Council election
2004 Burnley Borough Council election
2006 Burnley Borough Council election
2007 Burnley Borough Council election
2008 Burnley Borough Council election
2010 Burnley Borough Council election
2011 Burnley Borough Council election
2012 Burnley Borough Council election
2014 Burnley Borough Council election
2015 Burnley Borough Council election
2016 Burnley Borough Council election
2018 Burnley Borough Council election
2019 Burnley Borough Council election
2021 Burnley Borough Council election
2022 Burnley Borough Council election

Result maps

By-election results

1998-2002

2002–2006

2006–2010

2010–2014

2018-2022

References

 By-election results

External links
Burnley Council

 
Council elections in Lancashire
Local government in Burnley
Politics of Burnley
Burnley